Mink Run (Rabbit Run) is a tributary of the Tohickon Creek in Bedminster Township, Bucks County, Pennsylvania in the United States.

Statistics
Mink Run rises just east of Fairview Road in Bedminster Township and is part of the Delaware River watershed.

Course
Its average slope is  Wolf Run meets the Tohickon only a couple hundred feet downstream of Mink Run's confluence.

Geology
Appalachian Highlands Division
Piedmont Province
Gettysburg-Newark Lowland Section
Brunswick Formation
Wolf Run lies within the Brunswick Formation in the Newark Basin laid down during the Jurassic and the Triassic. Rocks includes mudstone, siltstone, and reddish-brown, green, and brown shale. Mineralogy includes red and dark-gray argillite and hornfels.

Crossings and Bridges
 Farm School Road
 Deer Run Road
 Fretz Valley Road
 Sweetbriar Road

See also
 List of rivers of Pennsylvania

References

Rivers of Pennsylvania
Rivers of Bucks County, Pennsylvania
Tributaries of Tohickon Creek